Connector is the second wide-release album, third overall (as they released We Speak in 2010), from American rock band I the Mighty, released on June 2, 2015 through Equal Vision Records.

Background
I the Mighty announced the album on March 27, 2015, with the release of their first single "Playing Catch with .22". They also released that Max Bemis would be featured on the track "Friends", as well as their plan complete the "Frame" trilogy with the final installment and first chapter of the story.

Reception

The album has been met with positive reviews since its release. Reviewers praised the band's newfound pop sensibilities and tightly focused arrangements.

Track listing

Personnel

I the Mighty
 Brent Walsh – rhythm guitar, lead vocals
 Ian Pedigo – lead guitar, backing vocals
 Chris Hinkley – bass guitar, backing vocals
 Blake Dahlinger – drums, percussion

Additional musicians
 Max Bemis – guest vocals on "Friends"
 Sierra Kay – guest vocals on "(No) Faith in Fate"

Production 
 Kris Crummett - Mastering
 Mike Green - Production

References

2015 albums
I the Mighty albums
Equal Vision Records albums